Milan Zorica (born 7 January 1992) is a Serbian footballer who plays for Omladinac Novi Banovci.

Career
Born in Knin, he played with FK Sopot before joining Serbian SuperLiga side FK Hajduk Kula during the winter break of the 2011-12 season. A year later he moved to FK Dunav Stari Banovci playing in the Serbian League Vojvodina.

On 13 July 2021, he signed with Omladinac Novi Banovci.

References

External links
 Milan Zorica at Srbijafudbal
 

1992 births
Living people
Sportspeople from Knin
Serbs of Croatia
People from the Republic of Serbian Krajina
Serbian footballers
Serbian expatriate footballers
Red Star Belgrade footballers
FK Sopot players
FK Hajduk Kula players
FK Bežanija players
FK Sloga Petrovac na Mlavi players
FK Bokelj players
OFK Grbalj players
Ängelholms FF players
FK Budućnost Dobanovci players
FK Železničar Pančevo players
Serbian SuperLiga players
Serbian First League players
Montenegrin First League players
Ettan Fotboll players
Serie D players
Association football midfielders
Serbian expatriate sportspeople in Montenegro
Serbian expatriate sportspeople in Sweden
Serbian expatriate sportspeople in Italy
Expatriate footballers in Montenegro
Expatriate footballers in Sweden
Expatriate footballers in Italy